Sweet Home is a South Korean apocalyptic horror streaming television series starring Song Kang, Lee Jin-wook, and Lee Si-young. Based on the Naver webtoon of the same name by Kim Carnby and Hwang Young-chan, which recorded over 2.1 billion net views, the series was released on Netflix on December 18, 2020. The second season is scheduled to be released in 2023.

A third season is also in the works.

Synopsis
After an unexpected family tragedy, Cha Hyun-soo leaves his home and moves into an apartment. Soon after, monsters begin appearing. People inside the apartment are trapped inside the building, realizing that monsters are lurking everywhere outside. Hyun-su and other residents shield themselves inside the building in the hope of surviving as long as they can.

Cast

Season 1–3 
 Song Kang as Cha Hyun-soo, a suicidal high school student who moves into 1410 in Green Home after his family is killed in a car accident. He finds himself caught in the middle of an apocalypse, he later gains the powers of the infected after merging with the beast inside him and becoming a superpowered being.
 Lee Jin-wook as Pyeon Sang-wook, a mysterious man with a scar on his face. He punishes evil with evil and is mistaken for a gangster. He has enhanced physical strength. He seemed to have a liking towards Yoo-ri.
 Lee Eugene as young Pyeon Sang-wook
 Lee Si-young as Seo Yi-kyung, a former firefighter whose fiancé disappeared two days before their wedding. She has trust issues and is an expert martial artist, having served in the special forces. Her character is exclusive to the television series, having not appeared in the webtoon comic.
 Go Min-si as Lee Eun-yoo, Eun-hyuk's younger sister and a former ballerina who quit due to an injury on her foot. She lives with her brother. Hyun-soo is her first love.
 Park Gyu-young as Yoon Ji-soo, a bass guitarist who moves into 1510 in Green Home after her boyfriend's suicide. She was saved by Jae-heon and after then sticks around him. Unlike the webtoon, she is a recurring character rather than a main one.

Season 1 
 Lee Do-hyun as Lee Eun-hyuk, Eun-yu's older brother, a medical student. He is the leader of the building's survivors. He handles everything with calm mind and rational decision, causing the others to regard him as remote and cold hearted.
 Kim Nam-hee as Jung Jae-heon, a Korean Language teacher and a devout Christian who lives in 1506. He has a keepsake jingum, a Korean martial arts sword, to defend himself and protect others. He saves Yoon Jisoo and sticks around her. In the show, Jae-heon and Ji-soo are romantically interested in one another.
Dane DiLiegro as Muscle Monster
 Go Youn-jung as Park Yoo-ri, a senior caregiver who appears to have some training as a medical care professional. She is asthmatic. She started to like Sang-wook.
 Kim Kap-soo as Ahn Gil-seob, a terminally-ill patient living with his caregiver Park Yoo-ri.
 Kim Sang-ho as Han Du-sik, living in 1408. He is the neighbor of Cha Hyun Soo, a middle-aged man who uses a wheelchair and a former military man. He is talented at making weapons. 
 Woo Hyun as Kim Suk-hyun, a grocery store owner who is often abusive towards his wife.
 Kim Hyun as Ahn Sun-young, Suk-hyun's wife
 Kim Hee-jung as Cha Jin-ok, a mother who was desperately trying to save her daughter, only for her to witness her death.
 Heo Yool as Kim Su-yeong, the 9-year-old girl and Kim Yeong-Su's sister
 Choi Go as Kim Yeong-su, the 6-year-old boy and Kim Su-Yeong's little brother
 Kim Gook-hee as Son Hye-in, a middle-aged woman who always carries her pet Pomeranian named Bom.
 Lee Bong-ryun as Im Myung-sook, a mother who lost her child when the stroller rolled away from her, causing a truck to collide into it. 
 Go Geon-han as Choi Yoon-jae, a Child Predator, heavily beaten up by Pyeon Sang-wook.
 Woo Jung-gook as Kang Seung-wan, a bespectacled and timid resident
 Lim Soo-hyung as Noh Byung-il
 Ahn Dong-goo as Lee Soo-ung, a soldier
 Lee Joon-woo as Ryu Jae-hwan, 
 Jeong Ha-dam as Kim Ji-eun
 Kim Sung-cheol as Jung Wooi-myung
 Kim Ji-eun as Han Yu-jin 
 Lee Ji-ha as Moon Hyeon-sook, Hyun-soo's mother
 Kim Yi-kyung as Cha Soo-ah, Hyun-soo's younger sister
 Lee Ki-hyuk as Hwang Seung-jae
 Yoon Ji-on as Hae-rang, Yoon Ji-soo's boyfriend
 Park Ah-in as The Girl Next Door
 Ham Sung-min as Park Ju-yeong, Hyun-soo's classmate
 Lee Won-seok as Ryu Jae-hwan, who lives in the greenhouse.

Season 2–3 
 Yu Oh-seong as Sergeant Tak In-hwan, leader of the Special Forces Guard 
 Oh Jung-se as Dr. Lim, a researcher of vaccines
 Kim Mu-yeol as Kim Young-hoo, a former UDT sergeant, and the second-in-command of the Guard Corps
 Jung Jin-young as Park Chan-young, a soldier in the Special Forces Guard
 Kim Shin-rok
 Yook Jun-seo
 Chae Won-bin as Ja-young
 Kim Jung-woo

Episodes

Season 1 (2020)

Production

Development
Director Lee Eung-bok "roughly" knew the ending of the Line Webtoon on which the series is based before the later released its last chapter in July 2020, though he decided to "differ a bit from the webtoon because [they're] showing on different platforms."  Ultimately, the live-action adaptation deviates dramatically from the original.

The series spent most of its budget, with each episode costing $2.7 million. Choreographer Kim Seol-jin and contortionist Troy James were chosen to record the monsters' movements through motion capture.

Casting
Although filming had already started, Netflix officially announced the series' lineup on December 18, 2019, with Song Kang, Lee Jin-wook and Lee Si-young in lead roles, and
Lee Do-hyun, Kim Nam-hee, Go Min-si, Park Gyu-young, Go Youn-jung, Kim Kap-soo and Kim Sang-ho as part of the ensemble cast.

Lee Eung-bok revealed that, during Song Kang's audition, the actor reminded him of Johnny Depp in Edward Scissorhands: "an image of someone who has a pure and innocent soul but is holding a spear in his hand." The actor was recommended to Lee Eung-bok by the director of Netflix's Love Alarm which propelled him to fame in August 2019. Lee Si-young's character does not appear in the original webtoon but the director "wanted to add a female character who can pull off really cool action scenes"; the actress being a former amateur boxer. She trained for six months prior to filming the series. Park Gyu-young admitted that she did not have high hopes about being picked for the series but "as soon as [she] left the audition set, the director called [her] and said to leave with a script."

In September 2022, actress Bibi ‎withdraws from filming due to timing and filming schedules, and an actress replaced her role.

Filming

Principal photography began in September 2019 and filming was completed in February 2020.

Visual effects
Designers from Legacy Effects, VFX Studio Westworld and Spectral Motion, who worked on films such as the Avengers and Avatar
as well as the television series Game of Thrones and Stranger Things, were recruited for Sweet Home.

Release
On November 18, 2020, Netflix released a trailer for the series announcing that Sweet Home would premiere on December 18. In June 2022, the series was picked up for two additional seasons.

Reception

Viewership
Sweet Home is the first South Korean series to enter Netflix Top 10 in the United States, reaching the top 3. Three days after its release, the series ranked No. 1 in 8 regions and was within the Top 10 in 42 regions. The show was viewed by 22 million paid subscribers worldwide in the first 4 weeks of its release and appeared in the Netflix top 10 in more than 70 countries.

It was praised by viewers for its "high-quality visual effects" and "the deep human connections among the characters." However, many criticized the soundtrack which they believe did not fit with the story, as well as the lack of monsters in the latter episodes of the season. On this, director Lee Eung-bok said that "[he] know[s] some of the viewers were anticipating more gore, but [he] hope[s] they will understand why monsters were absent from some parts of our drama."

Critical responses
Kavya Christopher of The Times of India gave a rating of 4/5 and said, "One does not need to be a lover of the horror genre to enjoy this series, thanks to the many underlying plots of the various characters – both big and small. The action is superb, to say the least, and the drama is endearing at various levels."

Joel Keller of Decider said that "despite its flaws and a premise we've seen before, Sweet Home distinguishes itself by its setting and its monsters. We will see if the drama between the survivors will keep us watching."

Pierce Conran of South China Morning Post gave a rating of 3/5, saying that "despite a breathless opening episode and some grisly fun throughout, Sweet Home does not provide much of a story for viewers to get hooked on."

In another mixed review, Meagan Navarro of Bloody Disgusting said that "what sprints out of the gate and sets up an exciting creature-filled horror series quickly comes to a slow crawl zombie apocalypse that we've seen many times before. It just swaps out the zombies for monsters."

Similarly, Jonathan Wilson from Ready Steady Cut said that "Sweet Home gets off to a racing start and never really lets up, leading to a frantic, messy, but ultimately enjoyable binge-watch."

Awards and nominations

References

External links
 Sweet Home on Netflix
 
 
 Sweet Home at Line Webtoon

Korean-language Netflix original programming
2020 South Korean television series debuts
Apocalyptic television series
South Korean horror fiction television series
Television shows based on South Korean webtoons
Television series about viral outbreaks
Television series set in 2020
Television series by Studio Dragon
South Korean pre-produced television series
Television series by Studio N (Naver)